Ostbahn in the General Government, were the Nazi German railways in occupied Poland during World War II, subordinated to the General Directorate of Eastern Railways (Gedob) in occupied Kraków; a branch of the Deutsche Reichsbahn National Railway of Germany in the newly created Generalgouvernement territory under Hans Frank. The trains were used to cleanse and resettle interwar Poland with the German-speaking colonists in the name of "Lebensraum", and played an essential role in the mass deportations of Jews to extermination camps during the Holocaust.

History

Following invasion of Poland in September 1939 Nazi Germany disbanded Polish National Railways (PKP) immediately, and handed over their assets to the Deutsche Reichsbahn in Silesia, Greater Poland and in Pomerania. In November 1939, as soon as the semi-colonial General Government was set up in occupied central Poland, a separate branch of DRB called Generaldirektion der Ostbahn (Kolej Wschodnia in Polish) was established with headquarters called GEDOB in Kraków; all of the DRB branches existed outside Germany proper. The Ostbahn was granted  of railway lines (nearly doubled by 1941) and 505 km of narrow gauge, initially.

In December 1939, on the request of Hans Frank in Berlin, the Ostbahndirektion was given financial independence after paying back 10 million Reichsmarks to DRB. The removal of all bomb damage was completed in 1940. The Polish management was either executed in mass shooting actions (see: the 1939 Intelligenzaktion and the 1940 German AB-Aktion in Poland) or imprisoned at the Nazi concentration camps. Managerial jobs were staffed with German officials in a wave of some 8,000 instant promotions. The new Eastern Division of DRB acquired  of new railway lines and 1,052 km of (mostly industrial) narrow gauge in the annexed areas.

Notes

 Governor Hans Frank (left) hands over the Ostbahn leadership to Adolf Gerteis. Also present: Josef Friedrich Buhler (in the background, first on the left) and Arthur Seyss-Inquart (on the right). April 1940, Kraków, Zakład fotograficzny Otto Rosner. Zbiory NAC on-line.

Rail transport in Poland
The Holocaust in Poland